Loris Gizzi (16 August 1899 – 6 October 1986) was an Italian actor.

Life and career 
Born in Rome, after his university studies Gizzi attended a school of dance and singing. He abandoned the courses when he became an employee of Ferrovie dello Stato, reaching the rank of sub-station master. In the 1930s, he discovered his vocation as an actor, attending several dramatic societies.  In 1935, during an outdoor show on the Palatine Hill in honor of royal guests, he was chosen to play Remus in the drama play Rumon; from then he entered the most important stage companies of the time, notably appearing in the 1938 representation of Francesca da Rimini by Gabriele D'Annunzio, staged by Renato Simoni and with Andreina Pagnani in the title role. Active in films since 1933, he had an intense career as a character actor, mostly cast in humorous roles. He played Gioachino Rossini several times, with whom he shared a physical resemblance. He was also active as a voice actor and a dubber.

Selected filmography

 Black Shirt (1933) - Un acceso sovversivo
 T'amerò sempre (1933) - Meregalli
 I'll Give a Million (1935) - Un ricco (uncredited)
 The Affairs of Maupassant (1935) - Dr. Walitzky
 Territorial Militia (1936)
 Lo squadrone bianco (1936) - Un turista (uncredited)
 The Amnesiac (1936) - Mario Tiana
 The Two Sergeants (1936) - (uncredited)
 Ginevra degli Almieri (1936)
 Condottieri (1937) - Malatesta
 I due barbieri (1937)
 For Men Only (1938) - Ladislao Paszkowsky, il regista
 Se quell'idiota ci pensasse... (1939)
 Assenza ingiustificata (1939)
 Il segreto inviolabile (1939) - Il signor Smith
 Torna, caro ideal! (1939) - Lord Cameron
 Il ladro sono io (1940)
 L'ultimo combattimento (1941) - Carrel
 The Betrothed (1941) - Il capitano delle guardie (uncredited)
 La sonnambula (1941) - Gioachino Rossini
 I Live as I Please (1942) - Il tenore
 Headlights in the Fog (1942) - Rico
 La pantera nera (1942) - L'ispettore Jackmil
 The Adventures of Fra Diavolo (1942) - Il prefetto
 I sette peccati (1942) - Gustavo Mazzoni
 Violette nei capelli (1942) - Il padre di Alda
 Labbra serrate (1942) - L'avvocato difensore di Carlo
 Maria Malibran (1943) - Giovacchino Rossini
 Lascia cantare il cuore (1943) - Massimo Rossi
 Gioco d'azzardo (1943)
 Sempre più difficile (1943) - Il sindaco di Marina Rossa
 T'amerò sempre (1943) - Meregalli (uncredited)
 In cerca di felicità (1944) - Il cantante Fasola
 The Priest's Hat (1944) - Il marchese Usilli
 The Materassi Sisters (1944) - Il sacerdote
 The Ten Commandments (1945)
 The Innocent Casimiro (1945) - Gustavo Corra
 Come Back to Sorrento (1945)
 Black Eagle (1946)
 Lost Happiness (1946) - Medico
 We Are Not Married (1946)
 Il mondo vuole così (1946)
 The Great Dawn (1947) - Cooky
 Il vento m'ha cantato una canzone (1947)
 L'apocalisse (1947)
 Difficult Years (1948) - Il ministro
 L'isola di Montecristo (1948)
 Totò al giro d'Italia (1948)
 Vivere a sbafo (1949)
 Santo disonore (1950)
 Accidents to the Taxes!! (1951) - Il capufficcio tasse
 Nobody's Children (1951) - Il direttore del collegio (uncredited)
 The Steamship Owner (1951) - Il direttore del Grand Hotel
 My Heart Sings (1951) - Commendator Cocciaglia
 Napoleon (1951) - Barras
 Destiny (1951) - Filippo Borcello
 Ha da venì... don Calogero! (1952) - Dottore
 The Overcoat (1952)
 La storia del fornaretto di Venezia (1952)
 Il tallone di Achille (1952) - Psicanalista Gregorius
 Nerone e Messalina (1953) - Decius Metellus
 Easy Years (1953) - Un fascista
 Verdi, the King of Melody (1953) - Gioacchino Rossini
 La prigioniera di Amalfi (1954)
 Neapolitan Carousel (1954) - Erik Gustaffson
 schiava del peccato (1954) - Customer in the Nightclub (uncredited)
 Theodora, Slave Empress (1954) - Smirnos
 The Three Thieves (1954) - Man soliciting funds from Tapioca (uncredited)
 Cardinal Lambertini (1954) - Count Orsi
 Milanese in Naples (1954) - Presidente della società
 Amore e smarrimento (1954)
 Disowned (1954)
 Are We Men or Corporals? (1955) - Il tenore
 The Song of the Heart (1955)
 The Two Friends (1955) - Un invitato
 Beautiful but Dangerous (1955) - Duval
 La catena dell'odio (1955)
 Da qui all'eredità (1955)
 Rigoletto e la sua tragedia (1956) - Il conte di Ceprano
 Difendo il mio amore (1956)
 The Violent Patriot (1956)
 Wives and Obscurities (1956) - Signor Baglioni
 Amaramente (1956) - Un invitato alla festa
 Io, Caterina (1957)
 Susanna tutta panna (1957)
 Serenate per 16 bionde (1957) - The Housebuilder
 Adorable and a Liar (1958) - Court Clerk
 L'amore nasce a Roma (1958) - Mr. Connolly
 Mia nonna poliziotto (1958) - Primario della clinica
 The Devil's Cavaliers (1959) - Prosecutor
 Caterina Sforza, la leonessa di Romagna (1959) - Checco Orsi
 Agosto, donne mie non vi conosco (1959)
 Avventura in città (1959)
 Un militare e mezzo (1960) - Pharmaceutical Chief
 Il carro armato dell'8 settembre (1960)
 Pirates of the Coast (1960) - Don Fernando Linares
 Constantine and the Cross (1961) - Roman Prosecutor
 Guns of the Black Witch (1961) - Governor
 The Secret of the Black Falcon (1961) - Don Pedro Ordigaso
 Some Like It Cold (1961)
 Queen of the Seas (1961) - Prison Director
 Suleiman the Conqueror (1961) - Suleiman II
 Ten Italians for One German (1962) - The German Consul in Rome
 Duel of Fire (1962) - L'intendente
 Swordsman of Siena (1962) - Councillor (uncredited)
 La donna degli altri è sempre più bella (1963) - Commendator Bartoloni (segment "La dirittura morale")
 Samson and the Slave Queen (1963) - Don Alvarez
 Hercules and the Masked Rider (1963) - Pedro - The King's Envoy
 Sword in the Shadows (1963) - Zio Roger
 Panic Button (1964)
 James Tont operazione U.N.O. (1965) - Goldsinger
 Giant of the Evil Island (1965) - The Doctor
 James Tont operazione D.U.E. (1966) - Mr. Spring
 The Son of Black Eagle (1968) - Procopovic
 I due crociati (1968)
 Black Talisman (1969)
 Heads or Tails (1969)
 Isabella, duchessa dei diavoli (1969) - Bassompierre the King's Marshal
 Zorro, the Navarra Marquis (1969) - Don Ignazio - Alcalde

References

External links 
 

1899 births
1986 deaths
Italian male film actors
Italian male stage actors
Italian male television actors
Italian male voice actors
Male actors from Rome
20th-century Italian male actors